GF Strong Rehabilitation Centre is the largest rehabilitation hospital in British Columbia. It is located in the South Cambie neighbourhood of Vancouver.

It provides inpatient, outpatient, outreach and clinical support services to clients/patients across British Columbia and the Yukon in four unique programs: Acquired Brain Injury, Spinal Cord Injury, and Neuromusculoskeletal. It also has specialized programs for adolescents and young adults.
Health care professionals such physiatrists deliver individually tailored treatment for people with the most serious and complex injuries and illnesses requiring rehabilitation. The team caring for patients at GFS may include: Respiratory Therapists, Occupational Therapists, Physiatrists, Physiotherapists, Social Workers and Speech Language Pathologists depending on the patients needs. Recreational therapists, Music therapists, Art therapists and peer support workers are also important parts of the rehabilitation team.

History
Following World War II, there was a large influx of soldiers returning to Canada with permanent disabilities, and there was no facility located in British Columbia to accommodate their needs. Dr. George Frederick Strong was a strong advocate for the building of a rehabilitation centre in BC after his daughter sustained a spinal cord injury. Dr. Strong joined with the Western Division of the Paraplegic Association to realise his dream. GF Strong Rehabilitation Centre opened in 1949, and has since grown in size and scope, treating patients from through BC and the Yukon.

Patient services

Acquired brain injuries (ABI)
This program offers rehabilitation treatment for patients who have ABIs, this may include strokes, traumatic and non-traumatic brain injuries. This program is run through inpatient and outpatient services, and help also help to connect patients with community supports.

Spinal cord injury (SCI)
The program has a 22-bed inpatient program, as well as outpatient support for people living in the community. The program encourages patients to realize their abilities and set goals towards rehabilitation. This program has a strong education curriculum for patients and families to better understand changes that occur following a spinal cord injury.

Neuromusculoskeletal (NMS) 
The neuromusculoskeletal program offers treatment to patients from Neuromuscular Disease, Polio, Burns, Complex Trauma, Multiple Sclerosis, Cerebral Palsy, Cancer, Amputation and pre- and post- lung transplant.  

Whether it is following a catastrophic injury or degenerative condition such as ALS, Multiple Sclerosis or Parkinson's Disease, patients receive intensive treatment and counselling so they can regain as much essential functioning as possible or learn how to best manage and cope with any remaining disabilities.

Affiliations
GF Strong Rehabilitation Centre provides a broad range of clinical services, including specialized care at Mary Pack Arthritis Centre. Through its affiliation with the University of British Columbia and other academic organizations, GF Strong Rehabilitation Centre in leading rehabilitation teaching and research. Some of its clinical programs include Alcohol & Drug, Amputee Team, Orthotics and Sexual Health.

Facts and figures
83 inpatient beds
600 inpatient admissions per year
1,600 clinic visits per year
550 employees

Contact information
4255 Laurel St.
Vancouver, BC, V5Z 2G9
Tel: 604.734.1313
Fax: 604.737.6359

External links
Vancouver Coastal Health 
Government of British Columbia

References

Hospital buildings completed in 1949
Hospitals in British Columbia
Hospitals established in 1949
1949 establishments in British Columbia